The Samsung Galaxy Tab Pro 8.4 is an 8.4-inch Android-based tablet computer produced and marketed by Samsung Electronics. It belongs to the high-end "Pro" line of the Samsung Galaxy Tab series, which also includes a 10.1-inch and a 12.2-inch model, the Samsung Galaxy Tab Pro 10.1 and the Galaxy Tab Pro 12.2. It was announced on 6 January 2014, and was released in the US on 19 February, starting at $399.  This is Samsung's first 8.4-inch tablet which is designed to be a direct competitor against the LG G Pad 8.3.

History 
The Galaxy Tab Pro 8.4 was announced on 6 January 2014. It was shown along with the Galaxy Note Pro 12.2, Tab Pro 12.2, and Tab Pro 10.1 at the 2014 Consumer Electronics Show in Las Vegas.

Features
The Galaxy Tab Pro 8.4 is released with Android 4.4.2 Kitkat. Samsung has customized the interface with its TouchWiz UX software. As well as the standard suite of Google apps, it has Samsung Apps such as ChatON, S Suggest, S Voice, S Translator, S Planner, WatchON, Smart Stay, Multi-Window, Group Play, and All Share Play.

Just a few weeks after being released, the tablet's Android operating system was officially updated to Android 4.4.2 Kitkat. The update has been rolled out in countries like the United Kingdom, Colombia, the United States, and many more. It brings some bug fixes, security enhancements and device performance improvements. It is available to users through OTA or through Samsung Kies.

The Galaxy Tab Pro 8.4 is available in WiFi-only, 3G & Wi-Fi, and 4G/LTE & WiFi variants. Storage ranges from 16 GB to 32 GB depending on the model, with a microSDXC card slot for expansion up to 64 GB. It has an 8.4-inch Super Clear LCD screen with a resolution of 2560x1600 pixels and a pixel density of 359 ppi. It also features a 2 MP front camera without flash and a rear-facing 8.0 MP AF camera with LED flash. It also has the ability to record HD videos.

See also
Samsung Galaxy Tab series
Samsung Electronics
Samsung Galaxy Tab Pro 10.1
Samsung Galaxy Tab Pro 12.2
Samsung Galaxy Note Pro 12.2

References

External links
 

Samsung Galaxy Tab series
Android (operating system) devices
Tablet computers introduced in 2014
Tablet computers